Statistics of Empress's Cup in the 1994 season.

Overview
It was contested by 20 teams, and Prima Ham FC Kunoichi won the championship.

Results

1st round
Nippon Sport Science University 1-4 Urawa FC
Toyama Ladies SC 1-2 Akita FC
Socius Amigo 1-8 Seiwa Gakuen SC
Asahi Kokusai Bunnys 2-1 Shimizudaihachi SC

2nd round
Matsushita Electric LSC Bambina 5-0 Urawa FC
Hatsukaichi High School 0-6 Fujita Tendai SC Mercury
Nikko Securities Dream Ladies 11-0 Sapporo Linda
Akita FC 0-9 Suzuyo Shimizu FC Lovely Ladies
Prima Ham FC Kunoichi 7-0 Seiwa Gakuen SC
Tasaki Perule FC 2-0 Shiroki FC Serena
Tokyo Shidax LSC 8-0 JEF United Ichihara
Asahi Kokusai Bunnys 0-1 Yomiuri-Seiyu Beleza

Quarterfinals
Matsushita Electric LSC Bambina 1-3 Fujita Tendai SC Mercury
Nikko Securities Dream Ladies 1-0 Suzuyo Shimizu FC Lovely Ladies
Prima Ham FC Kunoichi 3-0 Tasaki Perule FC
Tokyo Shidax LSC 0-4 Yomiuri-Seiyu Beleza

Semifinals
Fujita Tendai SC Mercury 1-2 Nikko Securities Dream Ladies
Prima Ham FC Kunoichi 1-0 Yomiuri-Seiyu Beleza

Final
Nikko Securities Dream Ladies 1-4 Prima Ham FC Kunoichi
Prima Ham FC Kunoichi won the championship.

References

Empress's Cup
1994 in Japanese women's football